Gabelbach or Gäbelbach may refer to:

Gabelbach (Zusmarshausen), a district of the municipality Zusmarshausen, Bavaria, Germany
Gabelbach (Ilm), a river of Thuringia, Germany, tributary of the Ilm
Gäbelbach, a tower block in the district Bümpliz-Oberbottigen of the city Bern, Switzerland